The Port of Jambukola or Dambakola Patuna is an ancient port to the north of Jaffna, in the Northern Province, Sri Lanka.

History
After Mihindu Maha Thero brought Buddhism to Sri Lanka in 250BC, his sister, Theri Sanghamitta arrived in Sri Lanka with a Sacred Bo Sapling one year later to this port. The temple Samudda-panasala (Jambukola Viharaya) was built commemorating the arrival of the Bo sapling by King Devanampiya Tissa (250-210 BC). Later, the same king planted one of the first eight shoots of the Sri Maha Bodhi, on the same place where he kept the original tree before bringing it to Anuradhapura. King Vijayabahu I (1070–1110) has restored this site. The remains of the vihara, such as the Buddha footprint stone and vatadage seen up to recent times no longer exist there.

This port gradually faded in importance while port Mahathiththa/ Mahathota/ Mantota (now Mantai) located at the mouth of Malvatu oya developed as a key intersection of sea-routes and the Dambakola Patuna Viharaya was lost in time. The Great Chronicle of Sri Lanka, the Mahavamsa and Samanthapaasasdika mention pilgrims coming from "Yonaka" country to Jambukola to worship the Jambukola Viharaya in the ancient times.

Present
Unfortunately today there is nothing on the temple which shows any antiquity. Most of the structures in the temple including the stupa which has been completed in a record 65 days have been done by the Sri Lankan Navy. Even the current bo tree was planted in 1998 by the Navy.

See also
 Port of Mahatittha
 Port of Mathoddam
 Port of Urkavalthurai

References

Ports and harbours of Sri Lanka